The Bistrița (sometimes identified as Bistrița Gorjană) is a right tributary of the river Tismana in Romania. It discharges into the Tismana near Șomănești. Its source is in the Vâlcan Mountains.

Tributaries

The following rivers are tributaries to the river Bistrița (from source to mouth):

Left: Negoiu, Văratecu, Vâja, Valea Lungă, Becheru, Mărului, Găunoasa, Viilor, Bâlta
Right: Lespezel, Salcia, Lupului, Frasinu, Padeșu, Boului, Bistricioara, Ogașu Hobiței

See also
Lake Ceauru (project)

References

Rivers of Romania
Rivers of Gorj County